Yesipovo is a rural locality (a village) in Borovetskoye Rural Settlement, Sokolsky District, Vologda Oblast, Russia. The population was 25 as of 2002.

Geography 
Yesipovo is located 4 km southwest of Sokol (the district's administrative centre) by road. Fokino is the nearest rural locality.

References 

Rural localities in Sokolsky District, Vologda Oblast